The Chihuahua Institute of Technology (in ) is a public university located in the city of Chihuahua, capital  of  the state of Chihuahua, in Mexico.

History

The Instituto Tecnológico de Chihuahua, also known as ITCH, was the first institute of technology in Mexico outside Mexico City. The first stone was laid on September 26, 1948 by the Public Education Secretary, Lic. Manuel Guel Vidal, and by the governor of Chihuahua State, Ing. Fernando Foglio Miramontes.

Construction started some days later, on November 13, and was directed by Ing. Alfredo Guevara Cepeda and by the auxiliary resident engineer, Ing. Jesús Roberto Durán.

The first principal of this important educative institution was Ing. Gustavo Alvarado Pier, who became the school principal on October 9, 1948.

On the year 1953 ITCH graduated the first generation of technicians in the country of Mexico.

On 1954 ITCH graduated the first generation of industrial engineers, which also was the first generation of the country.

Logo
The logo consists in a gear, showing three-fourths of the gear which contain 14 complete teeth and the remaining fourth with a drawing of a factory working at full speed, and was designed in an age when the industrialization of Mexico was the top priority.

Motto
The motto of the institute, "La Técnica por el engrandecimiento de México" (Technology for the Growth of Mexico), implies a commitment to improve the country by educating its citizens with state-of-the-art technical knowledge.

Mascot
The mascot of the institute is a panther, this symbol is mainly used when competing in sports.

Academics
Offers a variety of degree programs:
Electronic Engineering
Mechanical Engineering
Industrial Engineering
Chemical Engineering
Electrical Engineering
Electromechanical Engineering
Materials Engineering
Business Administration
MS in Electronics
Master of Business Administration

See also 

List of universities in Mexico

References 

Public universities and colleges in Mexico
Universities and colleges in Chihuahua (state)
Educational institutions established in 1948
1948 establishments in Mexico
Chihuahua City